Britânia Sport Club, commonly known as Britânia, were a Brazilian football team from Curitiba, Paraná state. They won the Campeonato Paranaense seven times.

History
Britânia Sport Club were founded on November 19, 1914, when Leão Foot-Ball Club and Tigre Foot-Ball Club merged. They won the Campeonato Paranaense in 1918, 1919, 1920, 1921, 1922, 1923, and in 1928. The club fused with Palestra Itália Futebol Clube and Clube Atlético Ferroviário in 1971, forming Colorado Esporte Clube.

Stadium

Britânia played their home games at Estádio Paula Soares Neto which had a maximum capacity of 4,000 people. The stadium was opened in 1943 with a match against Avaí – which was lost 1–4 – and demolished in 1998 to make way for a shopping center.

Achievements

 Campeonato Paranaense:
 Winners (7): 1918, 1919, 1920, 1921, 1922, 1923, 1928

References

External links
 Templos de Futebol: Estádio Paula Soares

Defunct football clubs in Paraná (state)
Association football clubs established in 1914
Association football clubs disestablished in 1971
Paraná Clube
Sport in Curitiba
1914 establishments in Brazil
1971 disestablishments in Brazil